Fruit slice may refer to:

 A type of cake, otherwise known as flies graveyard
 A type of cake, otherwise known as gur cake
 The candy gummy known as fruit snack